Diospyros ovalifolia, known as bastard ebony, is a tree in the family, Ebenaceae (Ebony family), endemic to the leeward side of South Sahyadri of Western Ghats of India and Sri Lanka.

Description

Full grown trees usually stand 12m tall.

Young branches are sparse-adpressed hairy. Leaves are simple, alternate, and distichous. Petiole is 0.5-1.0 cm long, canaliculate and glabrous. Lamina is 5-13 x 1.5–5 cm, usually narrow obovate. The leaf is coriaceous and glabrous with entire margin. Secondary veins are in 6-9 pairs.

Ecology

Trees are found in dry evergreen forests up to 800 m altitude.  With mature crowns occupying the canopy layer of the forest, they are known as canopy trees.

Vernacular names
The plant is known as:
 Malayalam: Karimaram, Vedukkanari, Karimpala
 Sinhala: KunuMaella
 Others: Karimbala, Vedi kandru, Karimaram

Flowering

Flowering and fruiting is usually in between March–August.

References

External resources

ovalifolia
Flora of the Indian subcontinent